was launched 30 April 1944 by John Trumpy & Sons, Inc., Gloucester City, New Jersey; sponsored by Mrs. Margaret O. Trumpy; reclassified YTB‑225 15 May 1944; and commissioned 19 September 1944.

Maquinna served the duration of the war within the Potomac River Naval Command. Struck from the Navy list 29 October 1946, she was presented as a gift to Washington, D.C., where for 13 years she saw service with the Fire Department as William T. Belt.

References 
 

Tugs of the United States Navy
1944 ships
Ships built in Gloucester City, New Jersey